Darkstar (Laynia Petrovna) is a character appearing in American comic books published by Marvel Comics. She has been depicted as a mutant superhero and a member of various super-teams in her career, including X-Corporation and Champions of Los Angeles.

Publication history

Darkstar first appeared in The Champions #7 (Aug. 1976), and was created by Tony Isabella and George Tuska. 

She became a regular character in Champions for the remainder of the series' brief run, though she never joined the titular supergroup. A memo from series writer Bill Mantlo revealed that he intended for her to be a "floating" member who would come and go from the book as the occasion called for.

Fictional character biography

Champions 
Laynia Petrovna and her twin brother Nikolai Krylenko were born in Minsk. When she grew up, she became a special operative, working for the Soviet government.

Darkstar is a member of a Soviet super-team recruited to bring Black Widow back to the USSR. However, she decides to switch sides and then fights alongside the Champions. She helps the Champions on a few more missions before returning to Russia.

Soviet Super-Soldiers 
Darkstar becomes a member of the Soviet Super-Soldiers with her brother Vanguard (Nikolai Krylenko) and the Crimson Dynamo. The Soviet Super-Soldiers battle Iron Man and Jack of Hearts on the moon but wind up helping them against renegade Rigellians led by Commander Arcturus.

Later, Darkstar and Vanguard are sent along with new Soviet Super-Soldier Ursa Major by the KGB to defeat Presence. They learned that Sergei is their father and that Professor Phobos has exploited the Super-Soldiers. Darkstar helps free Sergei and Starlight, and defeats Phobos.

The Soviet Super-Soldiers are then sent by the Soviet government to Khystym to battle the Gremlin. They fight the Space Knights Rom and Starshine, but later, ally with them against the Dire Wraiths. The Super-Soldiers befriend the Gremlin instead of fighting him.

Afterward, the Soviet Super-Soldiers agree to help bring Magneto to justice. They fight the Avengers but turned against the Crimson Dynamo when it is revealed that he had been manipulating events.

Darkstar, Vanguard, and Ursa Major defect to the United States seeking political asylum. They arrive at Avengers Island to ask for Captain America's help. They are beaten nearly to death by the Supreme Soviets, who had disguised themselves as members of the Avengers. The comatose subconscious minds of the Super-Soldiers form a "Great Beast" that follows the Supreme Soviets back to the USSR and try to kill them. Captain America persuaded the Great Beast to stand down, and the three Super-Soldiers later regain consciousness and recover from their injuries.

The Soviet Super-Soldiers are captured and returned to the Soviet Union. They are rescued by Blind Faith and the Exiles (not to be confused with the reality-hopping team the Exiles), whom Darkstar joins.

When the Supreme Soviets (who changed their name to People's Protectorate) are rechristened the Winter Guard, Darkstar was recruited back into the team. When the team disbanded, Darkstar and Vanguard joined a Russian mutant team, and later joined forces with their father, the Presence.

When Vanguard dies on the Starbrand mission led by Quasar, Darkstar and the Presence decide to kill Quasar, who allows them to believe that they have succeeded while he had left Earth.

Death
Darkstar joined the Paris branch of X-Corporation in France, in which she is possessed by Weapon XII, a creation of the Weapon Plus Project, and subsequently killed by Fantomex. A funeral is held at Père Lachaise Cemetery in Paris, where she was buried. She was temporarily resurrected through the Transmode Virus to serve in Selene's army of deceased mutants during their assault on the mutant nation of Utopia.

New Darkstars
A new, red-haired Darkstar named Sasha Roerich who is genetically modeled to resemble Petrovna first appears as a member of the Winter Guard. After being altered again by The Presence, she was transformed into a multi-tentacled Darkforce beast, before being killed by Red Guardian.

With Sasha's death, Reena Stanicoff takes over the role. She is killed during an attack on Winter Guard headquarters by a Dire Wraith, who then assumes her form. Although the Winter Guard fends off the attack, her death is subsequently covered up by the government.

Laynia Reborn
The Dire Wraith who assumed Reena's form is suddenly overwhelmed and taken over by Darkforce energy. Petrovna seizes control of the creature and resurrects herself. She reunites with her brother Vanguard and returns to active duty alongside her brother and Ursa Major. She fights Hyperion. She is later blasted into space with other members of the Winter Guard by the Intelligencia, but manages to survive.

Darkstar is present when the Winter Guard is reassembled.

Powers and abilities
Darkstar is a mutant who has the psionic power to access the extradimensional energy of the Darkforce dimension, which grants her several superhuman abilities. She is connected to the dimension by splitting her consciousness between her physical body and its Darkforce representation, both symbiotically linked. She can utilize the Darkforce for various purposes, such as causing Darkforce to behave like either matter or energy. Furthermore, she can project Darkforce as simple, mentally-controlled solid objects, possessing the density of steel, such as pincers, rings, columns, and spheres, or as a beam of concussive force. If Darkstar is rendered unconscious, any Darkforce constructs of her making immediately dissipate. Darkstar can teleport herself and up to three others by opening a portal into the Darkforce dimension and traveling through it; the maximum distance she can teleport has never been revealed. Because crossing the Darkforce dimension disorients her sense of direction, and the light of Earth blinds her for several seconds upon reemergence, traveling in this manner is risky.

Darkstar can levitate herself and fly at subsonic speeds by generating a virtually invisible portal into the Darkforce dimension along the contours of her body without passing through it, then balancing the attractive force of the dimension against that of the Earth's gravity. The upper limits of her powers are unknown.

Darkstar is a skilled hand-to-hand combatant, having been trained by the KGB and by Black Widow. She is fluent in both Russian and English.

While the original Darkstar's costume was designed by the Soviet government and was made of a synthetic stretch fabric insulated against the cold, the other two Darkstar costumes are composed of Darkforce material.

Reception

Accolades 

 In 2019, CBR.com ranked Darkstar 5th in their "Black Widow: 10 Most Powerful Russians In Comics" list.
 In 2020, Scary Mommy included Darkstar in their "Looking For A Role Model? These 195+ Marvel Female Characters Are Truly Heroic" list.
 In 2022, Screen Rant included Darkstar in their "10 Best Black Widow Comics Characters Not Yet In The MCU" list.

Other versions

Civil War: House of M
Darkstar is seen as a member of the Soviet Super-Soldiers.

Exiles
Different versions of Darkstar have been encountered by the Exiles:

 On Earth 3470, the native timeline of Heather Hudson of the dimension-jumping Exiles, the Soviet Union still exists. Darkstar is part of the Soviet Super-Soldiers.
 An alternate version of Darkstar was shown in yet another universe. She was a member of the Republican Guard, Russia's superhuman team, alongside Crimson Dynamo, Omega Red, Gremlin, and the Titanium Man.

In other media

Television 
 Darkstar appears in the X-Men: The Animated Series episode "Red Dawn". She is initially the mutant enforcer for a group of Russian generals seeking to reestablish the Soviet Union with Omega Red's aid. After witnessing the crimes committed by Omega Red, Darkstar rebels against the generals and sides with the X-Men and Colossus.
 Darkstar appears in the Avengers Assemble episode "Secret Avengers", voiced by Laura Bailey. This version is a member of the Winter Guard.
 Darkstar appears in Marvel Future Avengers, voiced by Eri Saito in Japanese and Kari Wahlgren in English. This version is a member of the Winter Guard.

Notes and references

External links
 
 UncannyXmen.net Spotlight On Darkstar

Characters created by George Tuska
Comics characters introduced in 1976
Fictional Belarusian people
Fictional characters who can manipulate darkness or shadows
Fictional characters with energy-manipulation abilities
Fictional Russian people
Fictional Soviet people
Marvel Comics characters who can teleport
Marvel Comics characters who have mental powers
Marvel Comics mutants
Marvel Comics female superheroes
Twin characters in comics